Mad Ship is a 2012 Canadian film directed by David Mortin.

Plot
A poor young Scandinavian immigrant couple winds up in Canada in search of prosperity, but the hardship of the Great Depression takes a toll in a way they never feared when they went in search of the dream. Mad Ship tells the true story of a Scandinavian immigrant who built a boat to carry the body of his dead wife.

Cast
 Nikolaj Lie Kaas as Tomas
 Gil Bellows as Cameron
 Rachel Blanchard as Adeline
 Martha Burns as Judith
 Aidan Devine as Edmund
 Gage Munroe as Petter
 Line Verndal as Solveig

Development
The house and barn used in the film were built on the set.

Reception
Mad Ship received mostly mixed reviews. said "Continuity might have conferred something of the stark, affecting sobriety of a Scandinavian film that Mad Ship seems to be aiming for." The Toronto Star said "There’s more to Mad Ship than what is on the surface, and Mortin — ably assisted by Michael Marshall’s gorgeous cinematography — gets there in the end. But not without a few rough seas in the telling of the tale." Canada.com said "Despite the excellent period production design that allows us to enter 1920s Manitoba, its desperate message of survival seems crafted for today’s world as economic uncertainty, hefty unemployment and poor stewardship of the land has left the rest of us searching for a rescue vessel on the greasy plains of 21st century progress." Digital Journal said "It's a strange film, although one with gorgeous visual images to spare."

Release
Mad Ship will be screened at the Raindance Film Festival.

References

2012 films
Canadian drama films
Films set in Manitoba
2010s Canadian films